The Radiation Laboratory, commonly called the Rad Lab, was a microwave and radar research laboratory located at the Massachusetts Institute of Technology (MIT) in Cambridge, Massachusetts. It was first created in October 1940 and operated until 31 December 1945 when its functions were dispersed to industry, other departments within MIT, and in 1951, the newly formed MIT Lincoln Laboratory.

The use of microwaves for various radio and radar uses was highly desired before the war, but existing microwave devices like the klystron were far too low powered to be useful. Alfred Lee Loomis, a millionaire and physicist who headed his own private laboratory, organized the Microwave Committee to consider these devices and look for improvements. In early 1940, Winston Churchill organized what became the Tizard Mission to introduce U.S. researchers to several new technologies the UK had been developing. Among these was the cavity magnetron, a leap forward in the creation of microwaves that made them practical for the first time.

Loomis arranged for funding under the National Defense Research Committee (NDRC) and reorganized the Microwave Committee at MIT to study the magnetron and radar technology in general. Lee A. DuBridge served as the Rad Lab director. The lab rapidly expanded, and within months was larger than the UK's efforts which had been running for several years by this point. By 1943 the lab began to deliver a stream of ever-improved devices, which could be produced in huge numbers by the U.S.'s industrial base. At its peak, the Rad Lab employed 4,000 at MIT and several other labs around the world, and designed half of all the radar systems used during the war.

By the end of the war, the U.S. held a leadership position in a number of microwave-related fields. Among their notable products were the SCR-584, the finest gun-laying radar of the war, and the SCR-720, an airborne interception radar that became the standard late-war system for both U.S. and UK night fighters. They also developed the H2X, a version of the British H2S bombing radar that operated at shorter wavelengths in the X band. The Rad Lab also developed Loran-A, the first worldwide radio navigation system, which originally was known as "LRN" for Loomis Radio Navigation.

Formation

During the mid- and late-1930s, radio systems for the detection and location of distant targets had been developed under great secrecy in the United States and Great Britain, as well as in several other nations, notably Germany, the USSR, and Japan. These usually operated at Very High Frequency (VHF) wavelengths in the electromagnetic spectrum and carried several cover names, such as Ranging and Direction Finding (RDF) in Great Britain. In 1941, the U.S. Navy coined the acronym 'RADAR'  (RAdio Detection And Ranging) for such systems; this soon led to the name 'radar' and spread to other countries.

The potential advantages of operating such systems in the Ultra High Frequency (UHF or microwave) region were well known and vigorously pursued. One of these advantages was smaller antennas, a critical need for detection systems on aircraft. The primary technical barrier to developing UHF systems was the lack of a usable source for generating high-power microwaves. In February 1940, researchers John Randall and Harry Boot at Birmingham University in Great Britain built a resonant cavity magnetron to fill this need; it was quickly placed within the highest level of secrecy.

Shortly after this breakthrough, Britain's Prime Minister Winston Churchill and President Roosevelt agreed that the two nations would pool their technical secrets and jointly develop many urgently needed warfare technologies. At the initiation of this exchange in the late summer of 1940, the Tizard Mission brought to America one of the first of the new magnetrons. On October 6, Edward George Bowen, a key developer of RDF at the Telecommunications Research Establishment (TRE) and a member of the mission, demonstrated the magnetron, producing some 15,000 watts (15 kW) of power at 3 GHz, i.e. a wavelength of 10 cm.

American researchers and officials were amazed at the magnetron, and the NDRC immediately started plans for manufacturing and incorporating the devices. Alfred Lee Loomis, who headed the NDRC Microwave Committee, led in establishing the Radiation Laboratory at MIT as a joint Anglo-American effort for microwave research and system development using the new magnetron.

The name 'Radiation Laboratory', selected by Loomis when he selected the building for it on the MIT campus, was intentionally deceptive, albeit obliquely correct in that radar uses radiation in a portion of the electromagnetic spectrum.  It was chosen to imply the laboratory's mission was similar to that of the Ernest O. Lawrence's Radiation Laboratory at UC Berkeley; i.e., that it employed scientists to work on nuclear physics research. At the time, nuclear physics was regarded as relatively theoretical and inapplicable to military equipment, as this was before atomic bomb development had begun.

Ernest Lawrence was an active participant in forming the Rad Lab and personally recruited many key members of the initial staff. Most of the senior staff were Ph.D. physicists who came from university positions. They usually had no more than an academic knowledge of microwaves, and almost no background involving electronic hardware development. Their capability, however, to tackle complex problems of almost any type was outstanding. Later in life, nine members of the staff were recipients of the Nobel Prize for other accomplishments.

In June 1941, the NDRC became part of the new Office of Scientific Research and Development (OSRD), also administered by Vannevar Bush, who reported directly to President Roosevelt. The OSRD was given almost unlimited access to funding and resources, with the Rad Lab receiving a large share for radar research and development.

Starting in 1942, the Manhattan Project absorbed a number of the Rad Lab physicists into Los Alamos and Lawrence's facility at Berkeley.  This was made simpler by Lawrence and Loomis being involved in all of these projects.

Operations

The Radiation Laboratory officially opened in November 1940, using  of space in MIT's Building 4, and under $500,000 initial funding from the NDRC. In addition to the Director, Lee DuBridge, I. I. Rabi was the deputy director for scientific matters, and F. Wheeler Loomis (no relation to Alfred Loomis) was deputy director for administration. E. G. ("Taffy") Bowen was assigned as a representative of Great Britain.

Even before opening, the founders identified the first three projects for the Rad Lab. In the order of priority, these were (1) a 10-cm detection system (called Airborne Intercept or AI) for fighter aircraft, (2) a 10-cm gun-aiming system (called Gun Laying or GL) for anti-aircraft batteries, and (3) a long-range airborne radio navigation system.

To initiate the first two of these projects, the magnetron from Great Britain was used to build a 10-cm "breadboard" set; this was tested successfully from the rooftop of Building 4 in early January 1941. All members of the initial staff were involved in this endeavor.

Under Project 1 led by Edwin M. McMillan, an "engineered" set with an antenna using a  parabolic reflector followed. This, the first microwave radar built in America, was tested successfully in an aircraft on March 27, 1941. It was then taken to Great Britain by Taffy Bowen and tested in comparison with a 10-cm set being developed there.

For the final system, the Rad Lab staff combined features from their own and the British set. It eventually became the SCR-720, used extensively by both the U.S. Army Air Corps and the British Royal Air Force.

For Project 2, a 4-foot- and later 6-foot-wide (1.2 then 1.8 m) parabolic reflector on a pivoting mount was selected. Also, this set would use an electro-mechanical computer (called a Predictor-correlator) to keep the antenna aimed at an acquired target. Ivan A. Getting served as the project leader. Being much more complicated than the Airborne Intercept and required to be very rugged for field use, an engineered GL was not completed until December 1941. This eventually was fielded as the ubiquitous SCR-584, first gaining attention by directing the anti-aircraft fire that downed about 85 percent of German V-1 flying bombs ("buzz bombs") attacking London.

Project 3, a long-range navigation system, was of particular interest to Great Britain. They had an existing hyperbolic navigation system, called GEE, but it was inadequate, in both range and accuracy, to support aircraft during bombing runs on distant targets in Europe. When briefed by the Tizard Mission about GEE, Alfred Loomis personally conceptualized a new type of system that would overcome the deficiencies of GEE, and the development of his LORAN (an acronym for Long Range Navigation) was adopted as an initial project. The LORAN Division was established for the project and headed by Donald G. Fink. Operating in the Low Frequency (LF) portion of the radio spectrum, LORAN was the only non-microwave project of the Rad Lab. Incorporating major elements of GEE, LORAN was highly successful and beneficial to the war effort. By the end of hostilities, about 30 percent of the Earth's surface was covered by LORAN stations and used by 75,000 aircraft and surface vessels. 
 
Following the Japanese Attack on Pearl Harbor and the entry of the U.S. into World War II, work at the Rad Lab greatly expanded. At the height of its activities, the Rad Lab employed nearly 4,000 people working in several countries.  The Rad Lab had constructed, and was the initial occupant of, MIT's famous Building 20. Costing just over $1 million, this was one of the longest-surviving World War II temporary structures.

Activities eventually encompassed physical electronics, electromagnetic properties of matter, microwave physics, and microwave communication principles, and the Rad Lab made fundamental advances in all of these fields. Half of the radars deployed by the U.S. military during World War II were designed at the Rad Lab, including over 100 different microwave systems costing $1.5 billion. All of these sets improved considerably on pre-microwave, VHF systems from the Naval Research Laboratory and the Army's Signal Corps Laboratories, as well as British radars such as Robert Watson-Watt's Chain Home and Taffy Bowen's early airborne RDF sets.

Although the Rad Lab was initiated as a joint Anglo-American operation and many of its products were adopted by the British military, researchers in Great Britain* continued with the development of microwave radar and, particularly with cooperation from Canada, produced many types of new systems. For the exchange of information, the Rad Lab established a branch operation in England, and a number of British scientists and engineers worked on assignments at the Rad Lab. *At the T. R. E., Telecommunications Research Establishment

The resonant-cavity magnetron continued to evolve at the Rad Lab. A team led by I.I. Rabi first extended the operation of the magnetron from 10-cm (called S-band), to 6-cm (C-band), then to 3-cm (X-band), and eventually to 1-cm (K-band). To keep pace, all of the other radar sub-systems also were evolving continuously. The Transmitter Division, under Albert G. Hill, eventually involved a staff of 800 persons in these efforts.

A radically different type of antenna for X-band systems was invented by Luis W. Alvarez and used in three new systems: an airborne mapping radar called Eagle, a blind-landing Ground Control Approach (GCA) system, and a ground-based Microwave Early-Warning (MEW) system. The latter two were highly successful and carried over into post-war applications. Eagle eventually was converted to a very effective mapping radar called H2X or Mickey and used by the U.S. Army Air Force and U.S. Navy as well as the British Royal Air Force.

The most ambitious Rad Lab effort with long-term significance was Project Cadillac. Led by Jerome B. Wiesner, the project involved a high-power radar carried in a pod under a TBM Avenger aircraft and a Combat Information Center aboard an aircraft carrier. The objective was an airborne early warning and control system, providing the U.S. Navy with a surveillance capability to detect low-flying enemy aircraft at a range in excess of 100 miles (161 km). The project was initiated at a low level in mid-1942, but with the later advent of Japanese Kamikaze threats in the Pacific Theater of Operations, the work was greatly accelerated, eventually involving 20 percent of the Rad Lab staff. A prototype was flown in August 1944, and the system became operational early the next year. Although too late to affect the final war effort, the project laid the foundation for significant developments in the following years.

As the Rad Lab started, a laboratory was set up to develop electronic countermeasures (ECM), technologies to block enemy radars and communications. With Frederick E. Terman as director, this soon moved to the Harvard University campus (just a mile from MIT) and became the Radio Research Laboratory (RRL). Organizationally separate from the Rad Lab, but also under the OSRD, the two operations had much in common throughout their existences.

Closure
When the Radiation Laboratory closed, the OSRD agreed to continue funding for the Basic Research Division, which officially became part of MIT on July 1, 1946, as the Research Laboratory of Electronics at MIT (RLE). Other wartime research was taken up by the MIT Laboratory for Nuclear Science, which was founded at the same time.  Both laboratories principally occupied Building 20 until 1957.

Most of the important research results of the Rad Lab were documented in a 28-volume compilation entitled the MIT Radiation Laboratory Series, edited by Louis N. Ridenour and published by McGraw-Hill between 1947 and 1953. This is no longer in print, but the series was re-released as a two-CD-ROM set in 1999 by publisher Artech House. More recently, it has become available online.

Postwar declassification of the work at the MIT Rad Lab made available, via the Series, a quite-large body of knowledge about advanced electronics. A reference (identity long forgotten) credited the Series with the development of the post-World War II electronics industry.

With the cryptology and cryptographic efforts centered at Bletchley Park and Arlington Hall and the Manhattan Project, the development of microwave radar at the Radiation Laboratory represents one of the most significant, secret, and outstandingly successful technological efforts spawned by the Anglo-American relations in World War II. The Radiation Laboratory was named an IEEE Milestone in 1990.

See also
 Telecommunications Research Establishment (TRE)
 Oak Ridge National Laboratory (ORNL), in Tennessee
 Research Laboratory of Electronics at MIT
 Industrial laboratory

References

Notes

General
Baxter, James Phinney, III; Scientists Against Time, MIT Press, 1968
Bowen, E. G.; Radar Days, Inst. of Physics Publishing, 1987
Brittain, James E.; "The Magnetron and the Beginning of the Microwave Age," Physics Today, vol. 73, p. 68, 1985
Guerlac, Henry E.; Radar in World War II, American Inst. of Physics, 1987
Page, Robert Moris; The Origin of Radar, Anchor Books, 1962
Stewart, Irvin; Organizing Scientific Research for War; Administrative History of the OSRD, Little, Brown, 1948
Watson, Raymond C. Jr.; Radar Origins Worldwide, Trafford Publishing, 2009
Willoughy, Malcom Francis; The Story of LORAN in the U.S. Coast Guard in World War II, Arno Pro, 1980
Zimmerman, David; Top Secret Exchange: the Tizard Mission and the Scientific War, McGill-Queen's Univ. Press, 1996

External links
MIT Archives: Celebrating the History of Building 20
Research Laboratory of Electronics History
IEEE Global History Network - MIT Rad lab Oral History Collection
28 volumes list of MIT Radiation Laboratory Series

Radiation Laboratory
Radar
University and college laboratories in the United States